Daniela Gârbacea (born 14 January 1974) is a Romanian biathlete. She competed in the women's individual event at the 1992 Winter Olympics.

References

1974 births
Living people
Biathletes at the 1992 Winter Olympics
Romanian female biathletes
Olympic biathletes of Romania
Place of birth missing (living people)